Pharmacis carna is a moth of the family Hepialidae. It is mainly found in mountainous areas, mostly in the Alps and the Carpathian Mountains, although it is also present in Hungary.

The wingspan is 32–44 mm for females and 25–34 mm for males. Adults are on wing from June to August in one generation.

The larvae feed on the roots of various grass species.

External links

Fauna Europaea
Lepiforum.de
schmetterlinge-deutschlands.de

Hepialidae
Moths of Europe
Taxa named by Michael Denis
Taxa named by Ignaz Schiffermüller
Moths described in 1775